Lauri Elias Ala-Myllymäki (born 4 June 1997) is a Finnish professional footballer who plays as an attacking midfielder for Ilves. He began his senior club career playing for Ilves, before signing with Venezia in 2021.

Ala-Myllymäki has played for Finland in various youth national teams and is regarded as one of the most promising Finnish players in his age group. He is known as a set-piece specialist.

Club career

Ilves

Ala-Myllymäki debuted on senior level on 15 June 2013 at the age of 16 in the ranks of Ilves in a match against KTP.

Venezia

On 5 November 2020, he signed a 3.5-year contract with Italian club Venezia.

On 31 January 2022, Ala-Myllymäki joined Triestina on loan until 30 June 2023.

Return to Ilves
On 24 January 2023, Ala-Myllymäki returned to Ilves on a two-year contract.

International career
He has represented Finland at international youth levels and he played in 8 out of 10 2019 UEFA European Under-21 Championship qualification matches.

Career statistics

Honours

Ilves 
 Finnish Cup: 2019

Individual 
Veikkausliiga Player of the Month: June 2019
Veikkausliiga Team of the Year: 2019

References

External links 

 U.S. Triestina Calcio official profile
 Lauri Ala-Myllymäki – SPL competition record
  

1997 births
Living people
Finnish footballers
Finland youth international footballers
Finland under-21 international footballers
Association football midfielders
FC Ilves players
Venezia F.C. players
U.S. Triestina Calcio 1918 players
Veikkausliiga players
Serie C players
Finnish expatriate footballers
Expatriate footballers in Italy